The 1828 United States presidential election in Vermont took place between October 31 and December 2, 1828, as part of the 1828 United States presidential election. Voters chose seven representatives, or electors to the Electoral College, who voted for President and Vice President.

Vermont voted for the National Republican candidate, John Quincy Adams, over the Democratic candidate, Andrew Jackson. Adams won Vermont by a margin of 50.46%.

With 75.23% of the popular vote, Adam's victory in Vermont was his third strongest state in the 1828 election after Rhode Island and Massachusetts. No Democrat was to win Vermont until Lyndon B. Johnson did so in 1964. This election marks the first time Vermont chose its electors by popular vote rather than appointment by the state legislature.

Results

See also
 United States presidential elections in Vermont

References

Vermont
1828
1828 Vermont elections